The Lincoln Rock Lighthouse was a lighthouse located on Lincoln Island, a small islet in Clarence Strait in southeastern Alaska, United States. It lay just off the west coast of Etolin Island, between it and Prince of Wales Island.

History
The original lighthouse was built in 1903 and was abandoned in 1909 after being damaged by a storm. In 1911 a manned fog signal station was built on Lincoln Island about 440 yards from the rock, and in 1944 a skeletal light tower was added. The lighthouse was deactivated in 1968. The lighthouse was later demolished and only the foundation of the buildings remain.

See also

 List of lighthouses in the United States

References

External links
 
 

Lighthouses completed in 1903
Lighthouses in Alaska
Buildings and structures in Wrangell, Alaska